|}

The Give Thanks Stakes is a Group 3 flat horse race in Ireland open to thoroughbred fillies and mares aged three years or older. It is run at Cork Racecourse over a distance of 1 mile and 4 furlongs (2,414 metres), and it is scheduled to take place each year in late July or early August.

The event is named after Give Thanks, the winner of the Irish Oaks in 1983. It was established in 2003, and it was initially classed at Listed level. It was promoted to Group 3 status in 2007.

Records
Most successful horse (2 wins):
 Tarnawa - 2019, 2020

Leading jockey (5 wins):
 Pat Smullen - Reform Act (2006), Sapphire (2012), Edelmira (2014), Zannda (2015), Eziyra (2017)

Leading trainer (7 wins):
 Dermot Weld - Reform Act (2006), Sapphire (2012), Edelmira (2014), Zannda (2015), Eziyra (2017), Tarnawa (2019, 2020)

Winners

See also
 Horse racing in Ireland
 List of Irish flat horse races

References
 Racing Post:
 galopp-sieger.de – Give Thanks Stakes.
 horseracingintfed.com – International Federation of Horseracing Authorities – Give Thanks Stakes (2018).
 pedigreequery.com – Give Thanks Stakes – Cork.

Flat races in Ireland
Long-distance horse races for fillies and mares
Cork Racecourse
Recurring sporting events established in 2003
2003 establishments in Ireland